Ra Chapman is a Korean-born Australian film, television and theatre actress and playwright. She appeared in Wentworth as Kim Chang.

born on 8 January 1985

Biography
Chapman was born in South Korea and was adopted by Australian parents in 1985.

She won the 2020 Patrick White Playwrights' Award for her play, K-BOX.

Filmography

Film

Television

References

External links 

 
 
 

Australian film actresses
Australian television actresses
Living people
21st-century Australian actresses
21st-century South Korean actresses
Year of birth missing (living people)